Inteha may refer to:

 Inteha (1984 film), an Indian film starring Raj Babbar
 Inteha (1988 film), a Pakistani film
 Inteha (1999 film), a Pakistani film
 Inteha (2003 film), a Bollywood thriller film
 Ishq Ki Inteha, a TV serial directed by Kamran Qureshi & Iram Qureshi